The Canadian Rocky Mountain Parks World Heritage Site is located in the Canadian Rockies. It consists of seven contiguous parks including four national parks:

Banff
Jasper
Kootenay
Yoho

and three British Columbia provincial parks:

Hamber Provincial Park
Mount Assiniboine Provincial Park
Mount Robson Provincial Park

The parks include mountains, glaciers, and hot springs and the headwaters of major North American river systems including:
North Saskatchewan River
Athabasca River
Columbia River
Fraser River

The area is known for its natural environment and biological diversity. It includes the Burgess Shale site, a World Heritage Site in its own right from 1980 to 1984, when it was included in the Canadian Rocky Mountain Parks WHS designation.

World Heritage Site

In 1983 Canada nominated Banff, Jasper, Kootenay and Yoho national parks for inclusion on the UNESCO list of World Heritage Sites.  UNESCO accepted this nomination in 1984 on the basis of a recommendation by IUCN.  The original nomination and IUCN's recommendation drew attention to the area's "exceptional natural beauty", "habitats of rare and endangered species" and its natural landforms such as mountain peaks, glaciers, lakes, canyons, limestone caves, and the unique Burgess Shale fossils.  That year the UNESCO World Heritage Committee "requested the Canadian authorities to consider adding the adjacent Provincial Parks of Mount Robson, Hamber, Mount Assiniboine and Kananaskis" to the Canadian Rocky Mountain Parks site.  At a 1990 meeting, "the Committee welcomed the Canadian proposal to include, in the Rocky Mountains Parks site, Mount Robson, Hamber and Assiniboine Provincial Parks, following its request at its Eighth Session in 1984."  Kananaskis (renamed Peter Lougheed Provincial Park) has not been included within the Canadian Rocky Mountain Parks World Heritage site.

See also

List of National Parks of Canada
List of World Heritage Sites in the Americas
List of British Columbia provincial parks
List of protected areas of Alberta

References

External links
Park page at UNESCO World Heritage Site
Climbing the clouds Virtual exhibit of British Columbia mountaineering

Canadian Rockies
World Heritage Sites in Canada
National parks of the Rocky Mountains
Parks in the Canadian Rockies
Parks in Alberta
Parks in British Columbia
Protected areas of the Rocky Mountains
Provincial and state parks in the Rocky Mountains